Hot Brook is a stream in the U.S. state of South Dakota.

Hot Brook is fed by a hot spring, hence the name.

See also
List of rivers of South Dakota

References

Rivers of Fall River County, South Dakota
Rivers of South Dakota